The Day's War is the debut studio album by British alternative rock band Lonely the Brave. It was released in 2014 and reissued with additional tracks – as The Day's War Victory Edition – in 2015 through Hassle Records and Columbia Records.

According to Metacritic, it has received generally favorable reviews from critics.

Track listing

Charts

References

2014 debut albums
Hassle Records albums
Lonely the Brave albums